Ann Monroe Gilchrist Strong  (1875–1957) was a notable New Zealand university professor of home science. She was born in Carthage, Illinois, United States, in 1875.

In the 1936 New Year Honours, Strong was appointed an Officer of the Order of the British Empire.

References

1875 births
1957 deaths
Academic staff of the University of Otago
American emigrants to New Zealand
New Zealand Officers of the Order of the British Empire